Francesco Indelli (died 1580) was a Roman Catholic prelate who served as Bishop of Guardialfiera (1575–1580).

Biography
On 14 October 1575, Francesco Indelli was appointed by Pope Gregory XIII as Bishop of Guardialfiera.
He served as Bishop of Guardialfiera until his death in 1580.

References

External links and additional sources
 (for Chronology of Bishops) 
 (for Chronology of Bishops) 

16th-century Italian Roman Catholic bishops
1580 deaths
Bishops appointed by Pope Gregory XIII